James Gerald Crowther (26 September 1899, Halifax – 30 March 1983) was one of the founders of science journalism. He was appointed the scientific correspondent of The Manchester Guardian in 1928.

James was the second child of James Crowther, the principal of Halifax Technical School, and his wife, Alice, (née Ainscow), a music teacher. 

Crowther attended Bradford Grammar School, where he met Ralph Fox who introduced him to Marxism. He also developed a sufficient interest in mathematics to gain a scholarship to study mathematics and physics at Trinity College, Cambridge. However his arrival there was delayed by the war, as he spent some time with Archibald Hill, applying a scientific approach to anti-aircraft gunnery. During the time he spent with the Anti-Aircraft Experimental Section of the Munitions Inventions Department he gained experience of scientific research.

When he arrived at Trinity College he became friends with A. L. Rowse.

On 7 March 1923 Albert Inkpin enrolled Crowther in the Communist Party of Great Britain.

In 1924 he married Dora Amy Royle de Bude and then started work for Oxford University Press as a travelling salesman selling technical books. He was thus able to support Dora and her six year old daughter.

He was appointed a commissioning editor for Oxford University Press by Humphrey Sumner Milford. In 1934 he married Franziscka Zarniko who he met in the USSR whilst visiting the Ukrainian Institute of Physics and Technology (UIPT) in 1932. Franziscka, who had ambitions to become a film maker was the German sister of Barbara Ruhemann, a physicist at UIPT, married to Martin Ruhemann. A third sister Jutte had married Kurt Mendelssohn.

Crowther remained in correspondence with the Russian physicist Boris Hessen following his visit to London as part of the Soviet delegation to the Second International Congress of the History of Science. This continued until Hessen's murder in the great purge during 1936.

On retirement he moved to Flamborough Head, Yorkshire. He died in Driffield on 30 March 1983.

Works
 Science in Soviet Russia (1930), reprinted (1936)
 British Scientists of the Nineteenth Century (1935, London)
 Famous American Men of Science (1937, London)
 An Outline of the Universe, (1931, London)
 The Social Relations of Science (1941, New York)
 Science at War (with R. Whiddington) (1948, New York)
 Science in Liberated Europe (1949, London)
 Radioastronomy and Radar (1961, New York)
 Six Great Astronomers: Tycho Brahe, Kepler, Halley, Herschel, Russell, Eddington (1961, London)
 Science in Modern Society (1967, London)

References

External links 
 

English science writers
1899 births
1983 deaths
Alumni of Trinity College, Cambridge
People educated at Bradford Grammar School
Communist Party of Great Britain members